Honor Thy Father (originally titled as Con-Man) is a 2015 Filipino thriller crime drama film directed by Erik Matti and starring John Lloyd Cruz. It was screened in the Contemporary World Cinema section of the 2015 Toronto International Film Festival. It was an official entry to the 2015 Metro Manila Film Festival.

Plot
The film is about a family who find themselves in a Ponzi scheme. Edgar (John Lloyd Cruz) and Kaye (Meryll Soriano) seek to pay their family's debt to Kaye's co-parishioners. The couple fear that the parishioners may hurt their daughter.

Cast
 John Lloyd Cruz as Edgar
 Meryll Soriano as Kaye
 Dan Fernandez as Manny 
 Tirso Cruz III as Bishop Tony
 Perla Bautista as Nanang
 Yayo Aguila as Jessica
 Khalil Ramos as Emil
 William Martinez as Pastor Obet
 Krystal Brimner as Angel
 Lander Vera Perez as Cedric
 Boom Labrusca as Erwin

Production

Development
The film was directed by Erik Matti. The film's lead actor, John Lloyd Cruz alongside Dondon Monteverde are producers of the film. Agosto Dos Pictures, was originally planned to be co-producer of the film along with Reality Entertainment. The film was originally titled Ponzi.

Casting
John Lloyd Cruz was chosen to portray the lead character of the film. The actor shaved his head for the role despite warnings from his big studio handlers that he might lose endorsement contracts, especially for a certain shampoo product. The actor sought to break away from the leading man role that people are familiar with in his mainstream films and also explained that his acting work isn't confined to his home television network, ABS-CBN, stating that he "refuses to be typecast". He sought to project a different image from the one audiences have gotten accustomed to by playing a lead role in an indie film.

Originally, Dingdong Dantes was also offered to portray John Lloyd's role but it was the latter that ultimately played the role.

Filming
The film was shot in Macabebe, Pampanga, Baguio and nearby towns. About 16 hours of shooting was spent inside the mines of Camp 6 along Kennon Road.

Release
Honor thy Father was first screened in the Contemporary World Cinema section of the 2015 Toronto International Film Festival. It was also screened in the Cinema One Originals Film Festival in November 2015. The film was accepted as an official entrant to the 2015 Metro Manila Film Festival after Hermano Puli, a historical biopic directed by Gil Portes, withdrew from the festival on October.

Awards

References

External links
 

2015 films
2010s crime thriller films
Philippine crime thriller films
Philippine thriller drama films
Filipino-language films
Films shot in Benguet
Films directed by Erik Matti